Sidse Babett Knudsen (born 22 November 1968) is a Danish actress who works in theatre, television, and film. Knudsen made her screen debut in the 1997 improvisational comedy Let's Get Lost, for which she received both the Robert and Bodil awards for Best Actress.

Following the critical success of her debut, Knudsen has been considered one of the top Danish actresses of her generation. In 2000, she again won both best actress awards for the comedy romance Den Eneste Ene (English title: The One and Only). In 2016, she won the César Award for Best Supporting Actress for the film Courted (L'Hermine). Knudsen has also received award nominations for her roles in Monas Verden (Mona's World) and Efter brylluppet (After the Wedding).

Knudsen achieved international recognition for her leading role as fictional Danish Prime Minister Birgitte Nyborg in the Danish TV series Borgen, and for her role as Theresa Cullen in the HBO science fiction-Western television series Westworld.

Personal life
Knudsen was born 22 November 1968 in Copenhagen, the daughter of Ebbe Knudsen, a photographer, and Susanne Andersen, a school teacher. During her childhood, the family lived in Tanzania where her parents did volunteer work. Upon returning to Denmark, Knudsen attended a "creative school." Knudsen is unmarried and is the mother of one son born in 2004.

Knudsen also speaks fluent English and French.

Acting career

From 1987 to 1990 Knudsen trained in acting at the Theatre de l'Ombre in Paris despite knowing little French. Upon returning to Denmark, Knudsen played roles for the experimental theatre OVINE 302 as well as at the Betty Nansen and Royal Danish Theatres in Copenhagen.

In 1997 Knudsen debuted in the lead role of Julie in Jonas Elmer's slice-of-life comedy Let's Get Lost. The film's script was only an outline, requiring the actors to improvise their roles and dialogue. Knudsen said she wasn't very good at improvisation and accepted the part only because she thought it would be a lightweight summer comedy. The film became a breakout hit in Denmark and Knudsen received both the Robert Award and the Bodil Award for Best Actress. Critics called Knudsen's performance dominating. Film critic Kim Skotte of Politiken wrote that Knudsen had hit a new tone with a "special ability to capture the modern woman's uncertainty and strength".

Following her appearance in the 1998 mystery Motello, Knudsen played the lead character in Susanne Bier's 1999 romantic comedy Den Eneste Ene. The film became one of the decade's biggest box-office hits in Denmark. It marked a new direction in modern Danish romantic comedies with credit given to Knudsen's acting style. Knudsen's portrayal of Sus, a woman who becomes pregnant by her unfaithful husband while she loves another man, again earned her both the Robert Award and the Bodil Award for Best Actress.

Knudsen returned to work with Elmer in 2000 as the title character in the comedy Mona's Verden. As in Elmer's first film, Knudsen was required to improvise her dialogue and character. Knudsen's portrayal of Mona, an uptight accountant who tries to stave off the romantic infatuation of a bank robber while being held hostage, earned her a Bodil Award nomination for Best Actress.

In 2020, she starred in the BBC drama Roadkill as the mistress of a British Tory politician played by Hugh Laurie. 

Knudsen reprised her role as Prime Minister Nyborg in the Netflix revival of Borgen, which was released in 2022.

Filmography

Film

Television

Awards and nominations

Notes

References
Morten Piil, Danske Filmskuespillere, Copenhagen: Gyldendal, 2001 
Peter Schepelern, "Internationalisering og dogme", from 100 Års Dansk Film, Copenhagen; Rosinante, 2001

External links

Sidse Babett Knudsen at Den Danske Film Database (in Danish)

Danish stage actresses
Danish film actresses
Danish television actresses
1968 births
Living people
Actresses from Copenhagen
Recipients of the Crown Prince Couple's Culture Prize
Best Actress Bodil Award winners
20th-century Danish actresses
21st-century Danish actresses
Best Supporting Actress César Award winners
Best Actress Robert Award winners